Evansville is a city in Rock County, Wisconsin, United States. The population was 5,703 at the 2020 census. Evansville is a part of the Janesville-Beloit Metropolitan Statistical Area and the Madison-Janesville-Beloit CSA.

History
Evansville was first settled in the 1830s by New Englanders who were attracted to the area by its pristine wooded landscape and the placid Allen Creek. By 1855, the city recorded its first plat and was complete with homes, shops, and churches. Evansville is named for Dr. John M. Evans, a doctor and postmaster during the city's early years.

In 1863, the Chicago and North Western Railway came to Evansville, accelerating growth. At this point, Evansville's economy was based on industry and manufacturing of carriages, wagons, pumps, windmills and iron castings. The economy was also based on agriculture: dairying; farming (production of wheat and tobacco); and stock raising.

By the turn of the twentieth century Evansville had over 1900 residents, and by the 1920s, most of the buildings in Evansville's future Historic District were completed.

The first newspaper, Badger, was established in 1894 by native sisters, Eleanor and Marilla Andrews and was run by all female employees. The first paper,
Vol. 1, no. 1 was published on Oct. 13, 1894 and the last, Vol. 12, no. 14 on Apr. 7, 1906.

1918 mob attacks
On November 11, 1918, Armistice Day activities celebrating the end of World War I took an ugly turn as some Evansville citizens began rounding up townspeople who they had deemed insufficiently supportive of the war, mainly due to their refusal or inability to buy war bonds. A German minister and his wife were apprehended on their way out of town before being brought downtown and forced to kiss the American flag. Other "slackers" were made to wear sleighbells as they rode atop a car's radiator, while others were forced to dance in a snake formation around a bonfire. A 73-year-old woman who passed on participating in the "Your Share is Fair" war bond campaign was dragged from her home by the mob, placed in a large animal cage and paraded about the streets before being parked before the fire. The woman, Mary J. Shaw, had previously bought bonds and supported the Red Cross and other war relief efforts. After refusing to salute or kiss the flag she was rescued by other citizens. Her attempts to see her assailants punished were brushed aside by the local sheriff, and testimony before the state legislature was similarly disregarded.

Historic District

The Evansville Historic District, which surrounds Main Street and stretches to the side streets of Garfield Avenue and Liberty Street, includes dozens of historic homes and other structures. The Wisconsin Historical Society called Evansville home to "the finest collection of 1840s to 1915 architecture of any small town in Wisconsin."

The Eager Free Public Library building was built with the bequest of a leading citizen, Almeron Eager, in 1908. Designed by the architectural firm of Claude and Starck of Madison, Wisconsin in the Prairie style, it features stained glass windows and plaster friezes just below the overhanging roof line. A 1994 addition at the rear of the original building was designed to match the original architecture, while adding much needed space and handicapped accessibility. The intersection on which the library stands also contains a Greek Revival home (now a funeral parlor), a High Victorian Gothic brick home (now housing the local Masonic Temple) and a classic Victorian "Painted Lady" home, still a private residence.

The Evansville Seminary was located near College Drive in the district. Its building was designed by architect August Kutzbock, but now functions as apartment homes.

In 1978, the historic district was placed on the National Register of Historic Places.

Geography
Evansville is located at  (42.779917, -89.300378).

Lake Leota

This  lake was formed by damming Allen Creek in the 1840s as a mill pond. Because of erosion into Allen Creek from upstream farm fields and the resulting silt deposits that accumulated, Lake Leota had become shallower over the years, reaching an average depth of only one and a half feet by 2000. One major issue that faced the city in the last 30 years was how to restore the lake to its original depth. The dam was opened in September 2005 to allow the lake to drain and its bottom to dry out. There was some controversy in Evansville over the cost of dredging, so a referendum was put to the city's voters in November 2008.  It passed by almost two to one, and dredging to a maximum of ten-foot depth was completed in February 2009.  The dam was closed shortly thereafter, and Lake Leota was refilled slowly.  A ceremony to mark the renaissance of the lake was held on July 4, 2009.  Citizens can now enjoy the natural beauty of the lake, boating in non-powered craft, and fishing. Since refilling, the lake has been stocked with panfish and bass, and "fish-cribs" sunk below the lake surface to provide breeding areas and cover for small fry.

Demographics

2020 census
As of the census of 2020, the population was 5,703. The racial makeup of the city was 91.0% White, 0.9% Asian, 0.9% Black or African American, 0.3% Native American, 0.1% Pacific Islander, 1.0% from other races, and 5.8% from two or more races. Ethnically, the population was 5.2% Hispanic or Latino of any race.

2010 census
As of the census of 2010, there were 5,012 people, 1,942 households, and 1,304 families residing in the city. The racial makeup of the city was 96.0% White, 0.8% African American, 0.5% Native American, 0.7% Asian, 0.5% from other races, and 1.5% from two or more races. Hispanic or Latino of any race were 3.6% of the population.

There were 1,942 households, of which 40.6% had children under the age of 18 living with them, 51.0% were married couples living together, 10.9% had a female householder with no husband present, 5.3% had a male householder with no wife present, and 32.9% were non-families. 27.4% of all households were made up of individuals, and 10.3% had someone living alone who was 65 years of age or older. The average household size was 2.54 and the average family size was 3.12.

The median age in the city was 34.7 years. 29.3% of residents were under the age of 18; 6.2% were between the ages of 18 and 24; 30.5% were from 25 to 44; 22.6% were from 45 to 64; and 11.3% were 65 years of age or older. The gender makeup of the city was 48.9% male and 51.1% female.

2000 census
As of the census of 2000, there were 4,039 people, 1,563 households, and 1,045 families residing in the city. The population density was 1,863.0 people per square mile (718.6/km2). There were 1,635 housing units at an average density of 754.1 per square mile (290.9/km2). The racial makeup of the city was 97.60% White, 0.12% African American, 0.42% Native American, 0.17% Asian, 0.05% Pacific Islander, 0.64% from other races, and 0.99% from two or more races. Hispanic or Latino of any race were 1.78% of the population.

There were 1,563 households, out of which 38.5% had children under the age of 18 living with them, 52.1% were married couples living together, 10.9% had a female householder with no husband present, and 33.1% were non-families. 27.7% of all households were made up of individuals, and 11.5% had someone living alone who was 65 years of age or older. The average household size was 2.51 and the average family size was 3.08.

In the city, the population was spread out, with 29.1% under the age of 18, 7.0% from 18 to 24, 33.5% from 25 to 44, 16.8% from 45 to 64, and 13.5% who were 65 years of age or older. The median age was 34 years. For every 100 females, there were 91.5 males. For every 100 females age 18 and over, there were 86.2 males.

The median income for a household in the city was $44,229, and the median income for a family was $58,451. Males had a median income of $35,614 versus $30,313 for females. The per capita income for the city was $20,766. About 2.6% of families and 4.1% of the population were below the poverty line, including 3.7% of those under age 18 and 5.6% of those age 65 or over.

Community

Evansville has four gas stations, several banks, a full-sized grocery store, and several specialty shops and restaurants. Over the last two decades, many of the downtown buildings have been renovated in the style in which they were originally built. In addition, in 2008, three blocks of Main Street that had been covered with asphalt in the 1960s were re-paved with 1900-era paving bricks, adding to the "old time" feel of Main Street.  The re-paving took place when major utility improvements were made to the city's downtown infrastructure.

Evansville shares a fire department with several surrounding rural towns.  A new fire station was built in 2008 on Water Street.  The police department then moved into the remodeled former fire department building on Church Street. The Evansville EMS is housed separate from the fire department and is located on Church Street as well.

The community has a large central park, Leonard-Leota Park, named in part after early settler Levi Leonard. The park contains Lake Leota, which has fishing, boating, and swimming. Park amenities include a baseball diamond with night lighting, a softball diamond, two tennis courts, a basketball court, a swimming pool, picnic shelters, and playgrounds. A skateboard facility was installed in 2006. In addition, there are several smaller community parks, among them Countryside, Franklin, and Brzezinski. In 2008, a new large park was opened on Evansville's west side to accommodate the new subdivisions being built there. The development of this park will take place over a number of years, but two full-size soccer fields and a children's playground are in place. Plans include baseball diamonds, basketball courts and picnic shelters.

Education

The city has four schools: Levi Leonard Elementary, Theodore Robinson Intermediate School, J.C. McKenna Middle School, and Evansville High School. In 2005, Evansville High School earned a Blue Ribbon award from the United States Department of Education. The Blue Ribbons Schools program honors public and private K-12 schools that are academically superior in their states or that dramatically demonstrate superior gains in students achievements

Business and industry

The major employers in Evansville are: Baker Manufacturing Company, a pump and well maker; Stoughton Trailers, which builds semi-trailer chassis; Varco-Pruden, which manufactures prefab metal buildings; and Evansville Manor, a nursing home.  Evansville has one home-town bank that has been in business in Evansville for over 100 years.

Some tracks of the former Chicago & North Western railway remain. The terminal had included multiple spur, classification, and industrial tracks, but after 1996, when the line was sold to Union Pacific railway, nearly all rail facilities in town were removed. The line, which at a point in time carried 70 mph-plus speeds, was left in a state of disrepair .  
The Evansville Depot, built in 1910 (replacing the older wooden depot) was  unmanned by 1970  and renovated for use as the local Legion VFW Post 6905 .

Politics
On April 4, 2006, Evansville voters participated in two referendums, one to urge a pullout of U.S. troops from Iraq, and the second to gauge whether voters supported "our honorable President's leadership" against "the unfathomable wickedness of the forces of terror". The first was approved and the second rejected. Although other Wisconsin communities held similar referendums, Evansville was the only one with two opposing referendums.

Media coverage

Newspapers
One of the early newspapers of Evansville was the "Badger" published by Marilla Andrews & Co. Established by Marilla and sister, Eleanora Andrews  in 1894 and ended 1906. It was published every Saturday and subscription rate was $1.00 yearly. The 13"x 20" 8 page republican based newspaper had a weekly circulation of 300.
Other early newspapers included, "Enterprise", "Evansville Review" and "Tribune".

Radio
WWHG (105.9 FM), a mainstream rock-formatted radio station with its studios in Janesville and serving the areas of Janesville and Madison, is licensed to Evansville. Evansville receives radio stations from the Janesville, Madison and Rockford markets.

Television
Evansville was featured on the Wisconsin tourism show, Discover Wisconsin, in February 2017. Evansville is a part of the Madison television market, television affiliates from Rockford are also available over the air and on cable.

Notable people

 Byron Andrews- journalist, co-owner of the National Tribune, private secretary to U.S. President Ulysses S. Grant during Industrial Excursions to Mexico and Cuba
 Allen S. Baker - Wisconsin State Representative, soldier and businessman
 John Baker - Wisconsin State Representative and businessman
 Merton W. Baker - U.S. Air Force Major General
 Cal Broughton - MLB player and chief of police in Evansville
 Marion Clinch Calkins, writer and educator
 Almeron Eager, Wisconsin State Representative, farmer, and businessman
 John M. Evans, physician and politician
 Kenneth O. Goehring - abstract expressionist artist
 Mariah Haberman - TV and radio host
 Kelly Hogan - singer/songwriter
 Benjamin Watson Hubbard - Wisconsin State Representative and farmer
 Burr W. Jones - lawyer, Congressman
 Ora McMurry - Distinguished Service Cross recipient
 Justus Henry Nelson - established the first Protestant church in the Amazon basin, self-supported Methodist missionary in Belém, Pará, Brazil for 45 years
 Martin V. Pratt - Wisconsin State Representative and businessman
 Lloyd T. Pullen, Wisconsin State Representative, farmer, businessman, and writer
 Janis Ringhand - current Wisconsin state legislator and former Mayor of Evansville
 Theodore Robinson - impressionist painter
 Charles Richard Van Hise - American geologist and academic; president of the University of Wisconsin-Madison
 John Wilde - artist

See also
 List of cities in Wisconsin

References

External links

 
 Sanborn fire insurance maps: 1894 1899 1907 1914

Cities in Wisconsin
Cities in Rock County, Wisconsin